The 1961 Colorado State College Bears baseball team represented Colorado State College in the 1961 NCAA University Division baseball season. The Bears played their home games at Jackson Field. The team was coached by Pete Butler in his 19th year at Colorado State.

The Bears won the District VII playoff to advanced to the College World Series, where they were defeated by the Duke Blue Devils.

Roster

Schedule 

! style="" | Regular Season
|- valign="top" 

|- align="center" bgcolor="#ccffcc"
| 1 || March  || at  || Unknown • Las Cruces, New Mexico || 17–3 || 1–0 || –
|- align="center" bgcolor="#ffcccc"
| 2 || March  || at New Mexico State || Unknown • Las Cruces, New Mexico || 2–4 || 1–1 || –
|- align="center" bgcolor="#ccffcc"
| 3 || March  || at New Mexico State || Unknown • Las Cruces, New Mexicoa || 11–3 || 2–1 || –
|- align="center" bgcolor="#ccffcc"
| 4 || March 14 || at  || Lobo Field • Albuquerque, New Mexico || 8–6 || 3–1 || –
|- align="center" bgcolor="#ffcccc"
| 5 || March 17 || at  || UA Field • Tucson, Arizona || 2–7 || 3–2 || –
|- align="center" bgcolor="#ffcccc"
| 6 || March 18 || at Arizona || UA Field • Tucson, Arizona || 0–2 || 3–3 || –
|- align="center" bgcolor="#ffcccc"
| 7 || March 18 || at Arizona || UA Field • Tucson, Arizona || 3–11 || 3–4 || –
|-

|- align="center" bgcolor="#ccffcc"
| 8 || April  || vs  || Unknown • Unknown || 11–0 || 4–4 || 1–0
|- align="center" bgcolor="#ccffcc"
| 9 || April  || vs Colorado Mines || Unknown • Unknown || 39–1 || 5–4 || 2–0
|- align="center" bgcolor="#ccffcc"
| 10 || April  || vs  || Unknown • Unknown || 11–6 || 6–4 || 2–0
|- align="center" bgcolor="#ccffcc"
| 11 || April  || vs  || Unknown • Unknown || 18–1 || 7–4 || 3–0
|- align="center" bgcolor="#ccffcc"
| 12 || April  || vs Colorado College || Unknown • Unknown || 34–1 || 8–4 || 4–0
|- align="center" bgcolor="#ffcccc"
| 13 || April 19 ||  || Jackson Field • Greeley, Colorado || 5–11 || 8–5 || 4–0
|- align="center" bgcolor="#ccffcc"
| 14 || April  || vs  || Unknown • Unknown || 5–4 || 9–5 || 4–0
|- align="center" bgcolor="#ccffcc"
| 15 || April  || vs Wyoming || Unknown • Unknown || 20–12 || 10–5 || 4–0
|- align="center" bgcolor="#ccffcc"
| 16 || April  || vs  || Unknown • Unknown || 10–5 || 11–6 || 4–0
|- align="center" bgcolor="#ccffcc"
| 17 || April  || vs Colorado Mines || Unknown • Unknown || 9–2 || 12–5 || 5–0
|- align="center" bgcolor="#ccffcc"
| 18 || April  || vs  || Unknown • Unknown || 24–3 || 13–5 || 6–0
|- align="center" bgcolor="#ccffcc"
| 19 || April  || vs Western State || Unknown • Unknown || 18–11 || 14–5 || 7–0
|-

|- align="center" bgcolor="#ccffcc"
| 20 || May  || vs Colorado Mines || Unknown • Unknown || 25–3 || 15–5 || 8–0
|- align="center" bgcolor="#ccffcc"
| 21 || May  || vs  || Unknown • Unknown || 11–2 || 16–5 || 9–0
|- align="center" bgcolor="#ccffcc"
| 22 || May  || vs Adams State || Unknown • Unknown || 4–2 || 17–5 || 10–0
|- align="center" bgcolor="#ccffcc"
| 23 || May  || vs Denver || Unknown • Unknown || 9–6 || 18–5 || 10–0
|- align="center" bgcolor="#ccffcc"
| 24 || May  ||  vs Colorado State || Unknown • Unknown || 15–3 || 19–5 || 10–0
|- align="center" bgcolor="#ccffcc"
| 25 || May  || vs Colorado College || Unknown • Unknown || 26–1 || 20–5 || 11–0
|- align="center" bgcolor="#ccffcc"
| 26 || May  || vs Denver || Unknown • Unknown || 3–0 || 21–5 || 11–0
|- align="center" bgcolor="#ccffcc"
| 27 || May 17 || vs Air Force || Unknown • Unknown || 4–3 || 22–5 || 11–0
|- align="center" bgcolor="#ccffcc"
| 28 || May  || vs Adams State || Unknown • Unknown || 12–9 || 23–5 || 12–0
|- align="center" bgcolor="#ccffcc"
| 29 || May  || vs Adams State || Unknown • Unknown || 6–2 || 24–5 || 13–0
|- align="center" bgcolor="#ccffcc"
| 30 || May  || vs Colorado College || Unknown • Unknown || 26–1 || 25–5 || 14–0
|-

|-
|-
! style="" | Postseason
|- valign="top"

|- align="center" bgcolor="#ffcccc"
| 31 || May 24 || at Wyoming || Unknown • Laramie, Wyoming || 2–3 || 25–6 || 14–0
|- align="center" bgcolor="#ccffcc"
| 32 || May 25 || vs Air Force || Unknown • Laramie, Wyoming || 10–6 || 26–6 || 14–0
|- align="center" bgcolor="#ccffcc"
| 33 || May 26 || at Wyoming || Unknown • Laramie, Wyoming || 16–12 || 27–6 || 14–0
|- align="center" bgcolor="#ccffcc"
| 34 || May 26 || at Wyoming || Unknown • Laramie, Wyoming || 12–1 || 28–6 || 14–0
|-

|- align="center" bgcolor="#ffcccc"
| 35 || June 10 || vs Syracuse || Omaha Municipal Stadium • Omaha, Nebraska || 5–12 || 28–7 || 14–0
|- align="center" bgcolor="#ffcccc"
| 36 || June 11 || vs Duke || Omaha Municipal Stadium • Omaha, Nebraska || 3–15 || 28–8 || 14–0
|-

Awards and honors 
Ernie Andrade
 All-Rocky Mountain Conference Team

Jerry Arthur
 All-Rocky Mountain Conference Team

Norman Idleberg
 All-Rocky Mountain Conference Team

John Koehler
 All-Rocky Mountain Conference Team

Jerry Maglia
 All-Rocky Mountain Conference Team

Robert Preisemdorf
 All-Rocky Mountain Conference Team

Julie Yearling
 All-Rocky Mountain Conference Team

References 

Northern Colorado Bears baseball seasons
Colorado State College Bears baseball
College World Series seasons
Colorado State College
Rocky Mountain Athletic Conference baseball champion seasons